Cercidospora is a genus of fungi in the class Dothideomycetes. The relationship of this taxon to other taxa within the class is unknown (incertae sedis). The genus was first described by Gustav Wilhelm Körber in 1865; it is synonymous with the name Prolisea described by Frederick Edward Clements in 1931.

Species
The genus contains 36 accepted species:

 Cercidospora alpina 
 Cercidospora anomala 
 Cercidospora arthroraphidicola 
 Cercidospora barrenoana 
 Cercidospora cecidiiformans 
 Cercidospora cladoniicola 
 Cercidospora crozalsiana 
 Cercidospora decolorella 
 Cercidospora epicarphinea 
 Cercidospora epipolytropa 
 Cercidospora epithamnolia 
 Cercidospora exiguella 
 Cercidospora galligena 
 Cercidospora harknessii 
 Cercidospora hypotrachynicola 
 Cercidospora lecidomae 
 Cercidospora lobothalliae 
 Cercidospora macrospora 
 Cercidospora melanophthalmae 
 Cercidospora ochrolechiae 
 Cercidospora parva 
 Cercidospora punctilla 
 Cercidospora punctillata 
 Cercidospora rinodinae 
 Cercidospora santessonii 
 Cercidospora solearispora 
 Cercidospora soror 
 Cercidospora stenotropae 
 Cercidospora stereocaulorum 
 Cercidospora thamnogalloides 
 Cercidospora thamnoliae 
 Cercidospora thamnoliicola 
 Cercidospora trypetheliza 
 Cercidospora verrucosaria 
 Cercidospora werneri 
 Cercidospora xanthoriae

See also 
 List of Dothideomycetes genera incertae sedis

References

External links 
 Cercidospora at Index Fungorum

Dothideomycetes enigmatic taxa
Dothideomycetes genera
Lichenicolous fungi
Taxa named by Gustav Wilhelm Körber